Donald Frederick Kennedy (September 3, 1921 – April 3, 2013), better known as Don Kennedy or Bud Kennedy, was an American film and television actor. He was known for playing the role of "Charlie Tucker" in the 1963 film Hud.

Kennedy was born in Los Angeles on September 3, 1921, to actor Tom Kennedy and Frances Marshall. He died in Del Mar, California on April 3, 2013, at the age of 91.

Selected filmography

Selected television

@lucia Cooper

External links 

1921 births
2013 deaths
20th-century American male actors
American male film actors
American male television actors
Male actors from California
People from Los Angeles
Western (genre) television actors